Laguna Torca National Reserve is a national reserve of Chile's Maule Region.
Laguna Torca is  South-West of Santiago, in the Maule Region 7. Situated a bare  from the Pacific Ocean and adjoins Lago Vichuquen, in the coastal mountains. The fresh water in the laguna comes from these local mountains, rather than the inland Andes.

Geography
The Reserve is divided into three very different areas.

Main Lagoon
Where 120 species of birds, have been spotted, according to Head Ranger Don Luis. Black-necked swans (1600 at the last count including some ringed birds from Valdivia), fill the Laguna. The feeding swans add to the tranquility of the scene, and the main road runs through the side of the laguna giving a close up view of the Wildlife. Coscoroba swans, pimpollo (white-tufted grebe), tagua (coots),and many more, all can be seen in the lagoon.

Fish in the laguna such as the liza, tench, and carp. However you won't see any as there is a no fishing, swimming, boating policy in the park! 

The reserve is a true sanctuary staffed by dedicated, knowledgeable, and very friendly Rangers. Viewing stations and a small reception centre is located at the Laguna. The main road cuts through one of the side arms of the lagoon and gives a great vantage point to see the many swans feeding.

Llico Forest

The second section of the National Reserve is Llico forest,(Bosque de Llico) an area which was forested with exotic species. This area is accessed through a long wooden bridge in the middle of Llico, and is a couple of kilometers from the Laguna. The sheer size of these old trees is something that is seen very rarely in this area with the modern forestry industry geared up for quick growth and replanting. Walking through the park under the shade of these giants gives a glimpse of the older times. The trees were planted originally to stop the inland march of the sand dunes from the beach at Llico playa.  It worked.

Cerrillos Island

References

National reserves of Chile
Protected areas of Maule Region
Coasts of Maule Region